The national debt of the Philippines is the total debt, or unpaid borrowed funds, carried by the national government of the Philippines. As of February 2023, the general government debt of the Philippines amounts to ₱13.42 trillion ($246.34 billion).

 Domestic debt:  ₱9.21 trillion ($171.02 billion) (December 2022)
 External debt:  ₱4.21 trillion ($75.60 billion) (December 2022)
 Total debt:  ₱13.42 trillion ($246.34 billion) (December 2022)

General Government Debt

References 

Finance in the Philippines
Government debt by country
Government of the Philippines